The Laundry Workers' International Union (LWIU) was a labor union representing laundry workers in the United States.

The union was founded in November 1900 at a congress in Troy, New York, as the Shirt, Waist and Laundry Workers' International Union.  It was chartered by the American Federation of Labor to represent both makers and launderers of shirts.  In 1909, its shirt makers were transferred to the United Garment Workers of America, but it began representing all workers in laundries, and became the LWIU.

In 1925, the union had 6,500 members, but this figure grew to 100,000 in 1953.  It became part of the new AFL-CIO in 1955.  In 1956, it absorbed the International Association of Cleaning and Dye House Workers, changing its name to the Laundry, Cleaning and Dye House Workers' International Union.  This merger occurred without the consent of the AFL-CIO, and in 1957, the federation expelled the union, on charges of corruption.  In March 1962, the union merged into the International Brotherhood of Teamsters.

Presidents
W. C. Brooke
1935: Bill Donovan
1943: Ray Nickelson
Sam J. Byers
1957: Ralph Thomas Fagan

References

Laundry workers' trade unions
Trade unions established in 1900
Trade unions disestablished in 1962